Kleshay were an all female British R&B trio from the 1990s, who had two Top 40 hits. Their first track was "Reasons", reaching number 33 in the UK Singles Chart in 1998, this got them onto Trevor Nelson's lick pick of the week. Their second single, "Rush", was even more successful and peaked at number 19, and thus they appeared on many different TV shows to promote the track including MTV's Select and SMTV Live. 

Dropped by their record label, the band then went their separate ways. Alani Gibbon made a duo with her cousin, the ex-Honeyz member Celena Cherry called Anotherside. Cherry provided backing vocals for a while for some established artists, and Leah Charles-King became a television presenter.

Discography

Singles
 "Reasons" (September 1998) UK #33
 "Rush" (February 1999) UK #19

References

English girl groups
British contemporary R&B musical groups
British R&B girl groups